Alex McGregor (born 27 August 1987) is a New Zealand born footballer with heritage from the Cook Islands. He plays as a midfielder for Eastern Suburbs in the New Zealand Northern League. He played for the Cook Islands during the 2018 FIFA World Cup qualifiers. He was personally responsible for the crucial signing of Joseph Dan Tyrell for ESAFC Nuggsy.

Career statistics

International

Statistics accurate as of match played 2 September 2015

References

External links 
 
 

1987 births
Living people
Cook Islands international footballers
Association football midfielders
Cook Island footballers